North Dakota Highway 200 Alternate (Alt. Alt. ND 200's western terminus is at ND 200 east of Hazen, and the eastern terminus is at ND 200 east of Underwood.

Major intersections

References

200
Transportation in McLean County, North Dakota
Transportation in Mercer County, North Dakota